Misinchinka Ranges, is the largest subdivision range of the Hart Ranges, of the Northern Rockies in British Columbia, Canada.  The boundaries of the Misinchinka Ranges generally lie between the Rocky Mountain Trench to the west, Clearwater Creek and the Sukunka River to the east, the Peace Arm of Williston Reservoir to the north and Monkman Provincial Park to the south.

The Misinchinka Range contains 33 officially named mountain peaks, including one ultra-prominent peak, Mount Crysdale.

Many peaks within the range are named for local Canadian soldiers killed in action during World War I and World War II. 

While there are no permanent settlements within the Misinchinka Ranges, the range is bordered by the communities of Mackenzie, Bear Lake, Tumbler Ridge and Prince George and lies within the traditional territories of the Treaty 8 First Nations; Blueberry River First Nation, Doig River First Nation, Halfway River First Nation, Mcleod Lake Indian Band, Saulteau First Nation and West Moberly First Nation.

Two 6.0 kilometre electrified train tunnels were constructed by BC Rail through the Misinchinka Range in the early 1980s to connect the coal mines of Tumbler Ridge to the provincial rail network.  The line ceased operations in 2000.

The  Coastal GasLink Pipeline project will pass through the Misinchinka Range between Mount Kinney and Alexis Peak.  Construction began in 2019 and is expected to be in service in 2023.

Sub-Ranges 

 Murray Range
 Pioneer Range
 Solitude Range

Prominent Peaks

Other Mountains 

Other official mountain peaks under 500 m of prominence include:

Mount Irwin, Azu Mountain, Uguznasechi Mountain, Thabah Mountain, Mount Garbitt, Mount Crocker, Mount Barton, Mount Wendt, Mount McPhee, Patches Mountain, Mount West, Dathseykaly Mountain, Tsahunga Mountain, Mount Thomas, Burden Peak, Mount Emmet, Powder King Peak.

References 

Northern Interior of British Columbia
Mountain ranges of British Columbia
Ranges of the Canadian Rockies